Yan Fengying (13 April 1930 – 8 April 1968), born Yan Hongliu, also known as Yan Daifeng, was a Chinese Huangmei opera artist who played dan (female) roles. Though she lived a short life, she left such a mark and is today remembered as the "queen of Huangmei opera".

Like most famous Chinese opera artists, Yan Fengying suffered greatly in the Cultural Revolution (1966–1976). Charged with 13 (trumped up) criminal counts of "counterrevolutionary activities" and tortured beyond enduring, she killed herself in 1968. Her death reveals the shocking cruelty and lunacy of that period. After her overdosing on sleeping pills was discovered by her husband Wang Guanya, instead of rushing her to the hospital, the authorities held a struggle session at her bedside. One hospital refused to admit her, and the one that did, reluctantly, refused to treat her without permission from her danwei (work unit). She died without receiving treatment, but was promptly dissected to find out whether she carried an enemy (Kuomintang) radio transmitter in her body. Writer Geling Yan, who grew up in Hefei, described what she saw on that day in a 2012 interview:

Wang Guanya published a biography of her in 1981, and wrote the screenplay of the TV series Yan Fengying. The 1988 biopic, which starred "the next Yan Fengying" Ma Lan in the titular role, became a national hit (and made Ma Lan well known among those who do not listen to opera). One man was so moved by Yan's tragic fate that he sold all his clothes to travel from Fujian to Hefei to "beat up" Wang Guanya because he thought Wang did not protect his wife enough. More people, however, sympathized with Wang, who was himself tortured, and many girls offered to marry him. Until his death in 2013, Wang Guanya never remarried. He spent the rest of his life adapting Yan Fengying's repertoire into TV series, radio series, and Huangmei operas for the younger generation.

Repertoire (incomplete)

References

1930 births
1968 suicides
People from Tongcheng, Anhui
20th-century Chinese actresses
Suicides during the Cultural Revolution
Drug-related suicides in China
Huangmei opera actresses
Chinese film actresses
Singers from Anhui
Actresses from Anhui
20th-century Chinese women singers